Iba Habeeb Okunola  (born ) is a Nigerian entrepreneur, investor, and philanthropist who currently serves as the Chief Executive Officer of TILT Group, a multinational conglomerate headquartered in Nigeria with diversified investments spanning key business sectors of the African economy, including energy, construction, engineering, agriculture, and technology.

Education and Early Life 
He attended Santa Maria School in Lagos state for his primary education and had his secondary education at Community Grammar School, in Surulere, Lagos. Thereafter, he proceeded to the University of Lagos where he bagged a Bachelor of Science (B.sc) degree in Philosophy in 2006. Over the past decade, he has attended executive education programmes at Harvard Business School and London Business School

Career 
He travelled to the United Kingdom in 2007 after completing his first degree. While in the United Kingdom, he worked with Grovetex Consulting as a Business Development Officer, rising through the ranks. Afterwards, he returned to Nigeria to set up his first company, Habtob Global Ventures in 2009. He continued to make progress with his entrepreneurial strides and went on to set up TILT Construction, the flagship of TILT Group in 2012.

Since then, he has led the rapid growth of the Group’s flagship and its other subsidiaries to become renowned private and public sector contractors with several successful and ongoing projects in different parts of the world. TILT Group has partnered with public and private sector organisations to deliver monumental and critical assets, including the construction of 330 KVA transmission lines, the renovation and remodelling of Kaduna State House of Assembly, construction of state-of-the-art visual arts centre in Ilorin, Kwara State, remediation of the hydrocarbon-impacted sites in Ogoniland, amongst other monumental turnkey projects.

He sits on the board of diverse blue-chip companies and startups.

Philanthropy 
Iba Habeeb Okunola has remained committed to the pursuit of the greatest good for the greatest number, towards achieving the future we want, and a society for all, through the vehicle of his non-profit organisation - Habeeb Okunola Foundation, an organisation established to consolidate the efforts of government in achieving social justice across Africa.

Habeeb Okunola Foundation has impacted the lives of no fewer than twenty thousand underserved Nigerians, with a deliberate focus on consolidating the delivery of the United Nations Sustainable Development Goals in Nigeria.

National Honour 

High Chief Okunola was conferred Nigeria's national honour - Member of the Order of the Niger by President Muhammadu Buhari in recognition of his diligence to service, commitment and impactful contributions towards consolidating socioeconomic development in Nigeria and for Nigerians.

He was recognised alongside 437 Nigerians from various walks of life; who received national honours. They include Amina J. Mohammed, Ahmad Lawan, Wole Olanipekun, Jim Ovia, Tony Elumelu, Teni (singer), K1 De Ultimate, the late Ameyo Adadevoh (who sacrificed her life to save Nigeria from experiencing the viral spread of Ebola virus), and other eminent personalities.

Recognition & Awards 
With numerous recognition and awards tied to his name, Iba Habeeb Okunola is more decorated than a 'Christmas Tree'. His entrepreneurial accomplishments and commitment to fostering sustainable development are not only assured, but globally recognised by Forbes, Fortune, United Nations, etc.

Apart from being a recipient of numerous honours, He is a first-class High Chief in Nigeria. He is the Akosin of Yorubaland, and also the Aare Tayese of Iseyinland. His notable awards and recognition include the following

 Member of the Order of the Niger (MON) by President of the Federal Republic of Nigeria, His Excellency Muhammadu Buhari GCFR  
 National Drug Law Enforcement Agency (NDLEA) Ambassador of War Against Drug Abuse  
 Award for Excellence and Business Innovation at the 6th Annual Nigeria Entrepreneurs Award
 Omoluabi award for “Integrity in Conduct 
 ECOWAS Youth Council’s Distinguished African personality 
 Excellence in Business Leadership and Community Development

References

Recipients of the Order of the Niger
Nigerian business executives
Nigerian investors
Nigerian philanthropists
University of Lagos alumni
21st-century Nigerian businesspeople
Yoruba businesspeople
Living people
1981 births
Yoruba philanthropists